Chandler & Co is a British television detective drama series, created and written by Paula Milne, that first broadcast on BBC1 on 12 July 1994, and ran for two series. The series starred Catherine Russell as Elly Chandler, a private detective who runs her own agency. In the first series, she works alongside her sister-in-law Dee Tate (Barbara Flynn). In the second series, Tate is replaced by Kate Phillips (Susan Fleetwood), a former client turned employee. Peter Capaldi, Struan Rodger and Ann Gosling all co-starred in the first series.

Aside from Russell, the second series was made up of an entirely different cast, with Graham McGarth, Eloise Brown and Adrian Lukis among the new cast members. Both series were produced by Ann Skinner. Independent reviews of the series were mixed, however The Consulting Detective said of the series; "Chandler & Co is a wonderfully dry, witty and yet truthful series about two women finding their place in the world. It is a joy to watch and can hold its chin up high in the cavalcade of detective dramas that have gone before and since". After years of remaining unavailable on any commercial format, both series were released in a four-disc DVD box set on 5 October 2015, via Simply Media.

Cast
 Catherine Russell as Elly Chandler
 Barbara Flynn as Dee Tate
 Peter Capaldi as Larry Blakeson
 Struan Rodger as David Tate
 Ann Gosling as Joanna Tate
 Edward Holmes as Sam Tate 
 Indra Ové as Misty
 Susan Fleetwood as Kate Phillips
 Eloise Brown as Hannah Tompkins
 Graham McGarth as Benjamin Phillips
 Tobias Saunders as Danny Hogarth
 Adrian Lukis as Mark Judd
 Bill Britten as Simon Wood

Episodes

Series 1 (1994)

Series 2 (1995)

References

External links

Entry at ThrillingDetective.com

1994 British television series debuts
1995 British television series endings
1990s British drama television series
English-language television shows
British crime drama television series
Detective television series
BBC television dramas
Television series produced at Pinewood Studios
Television shows set in the United Kingdom